This is a list of mayors of Springfield, Illinois, United States.

Table

Notes

References

External links
Genealogy Trails - Mayors of Springfield, IL
William Jayne's Bio
Political Graveyard
Info on Nelson O. Howarth
J. Michael Houston
Roy Reece
Info on David Griffiths, Samuel Bullard and John Schnepp
Bio of Marion U. Woodruff

Springfield

1840 establishments in Illinois